Pongpat Wachirabunjong is a Thai singer, actor, film director and TV series director and producer. 

He graduated in bachelor in health of physical education from Srinakharinwirot University.

He is well known in Thailand for his role in the action films Heaven's Seven and Seven Street Fighters.

In addition to his film roles, he has starred in many lakorns (Thai soap operas), and is a popular singer.

Pongpat made his debut as a director in 2007 with the critically acclaimed drama film, Me ... Myself.

Filmography

As actor
Film

Television

As director
Film

Television

Music
Pongpat released several albums during the late 1980s and early 1990s with the now-defunct label Kita Records. His first album was pop rock, while his later records were more rock-oriented. Some of his better-known songs include Tua Samrong (ตัวสำรอง), Ik Nan (อีกนาน), Fun Fuen (ฟั่นเฟือน), Chai Naklaeng (ใจนักเลง), and Mai Ru Ni Wa (ไม่รู้นี่หว่า).

After a long time away from the music scene, on 22 January 2007, he rejoined fellow artists from the same label for a concert called the "Kita Back to the Future Concert".

Discography
Below is a list of Pongpat's studio releases. It does not include various collection albums.
 Pongpat (พงษ์พัฒน์) (1988)
 Pongpat Phak 2 (พงษ์พัฒน์ ภาค 2) (1989)
 Pongpat Phak Phitsadan (พงษ์พัฒน์ ภาคพิสดาร) (1990)
 Pongpat Phak 3 (พงษ์พัฒน์ ภาค 3) (1991)
 Rock Ni Wa (ร็อคนี่หว่า) (1992)
 Nakak Rock (หน้ากากร็อค) (1994)
 101-7-Yan Rock (101-7-ย่านร็อค) (1995)

References

External links

 

Pongpat Wachirabunjong
Pongpat Wachirabunjong
1961 births
Living people
Pongpat Wachirabunjong
Pongpat Wachirabunjong
Pongpat Wachirabunjong
Pongpat Wachirabunjong
Pongpat Wachirabunjong

Pongpat Wachirabunjong
Pongpat Wachirabunjong
Pongpat Wachirabunjong